Michael Lawrence Kelly (born 22 October 1954) is an English former professional footballer who played in the Football League as a midfielder.

He later played for Cray Wanderers, earning a Kent League winners' medal in 1980-81.

References

Sources

1954 births
Living people
Footballers from Belvedere, London
English footballers
Association football midfielders
Millwall F.C. players
Charlton Athletic F.C. players
Dartford F.C. players
Carshalton Athletic F.C. players
Bexley United F.C. players
Cray Wanderers F.C. players
English Football League players